Guinea-Bissau was claimed by Portugal from the 1450s to the 1970s. However, Portuguese control of the region was limited to forts along the coast. Portugal gained full control of the mainland after the pacification campaigns of 1912-15, the offshore Bijago islands weren't colonised until 1936 establishing total control of Guinea-Bissau. Since independence in 1974, the country was controlled by a single-party system until 1991. Following the introduction of multi-party politics in 1991, the first multi-party elections were held in 1994.

Pre-European Contact

Empires and Kingdoms

Kaabu Province of Imperial Mali (1200-1537) - Kaabu Empire (1537-1867)

Origins 
Kaabu was established as a province of Mali through the conquest of the Senegambia by the one of the generals of Sundiata Keita called Tiramakhan Troare. According to oral tradition Tiramakhan went to the region in retaliation for an insult given to Sundiata by the Wolof King, resulting in the conquest of the Wolof's, and then carried down past the River Gambia into the Casamance. This initiated a migration of Mandinka into the region in the 13th century, though a small population of Mandinka already lived there. The 14th century a lot of Guinea Bissau was under Mali administration and ruled by a Farim Kaabu (Commander of Kaabu).

The decline of the Mali Empire in the 14th century lead to Kaabu becoming independent in the 16th century. The right to rule came from their history as an imperial province, Farim Kaabu was replaced with Kaabu Mansaba. The capital of the empire was Kansala, modern day Gabu, eastern Guinea Bissau in the Geba region (p. 4). All the region excluding the Papels, Manjaks, and western Biafadas obeyed and paid dues to the Mansaba (p. 367).

Society 
The empire ran more militaristic with stricter social stratifications than the Mali Empire. The ruling classes were composed of elite warriors from the Nyancho ( Ñaanco) tracing their patrilineal lineage to Tiramakhan Troare, and matrilineal to a mysterious native called Baleba who was believed to possess supernatural powers (p. 3). The Mansaba was established matrilineally through the sister of the Mansaba, whose son would be next in line (p. 3).

The Nyancho were immersed in a warrior culture, and were reputed to be excellent cavalry men and warring raiders, slaves farmed and maintained their mounts, for the Nyancho the highest honour was to achieve Mansaba (p. 6). Young men would travel solely for the goal of marauding and war. Europeans reported these were expert horsemen to the point other kingdoms requested them, and they typically filled the high military ranks of other forces (p. 369).

The society was militaristic focused on control of the slave trade in the region. The warrior clans became rich trading with the Europeans (p. 6). In efforts to stave off northern military incursions from the Serer and Wolof states, and control trade they incorporated surrounding states, giving better protect to themselves and securing economic gain from the trade markets (p. 7). Trade would bring the noble spirits, imported cloth, beads, metal ware, and firearms as commodities that enhanced their prestige, and a surplus of foodstuffs providing security and securing political alliances (p. 8). The life maintained by the elites had to of course be sustained, this is where commoners and slaves became useful, the latter maintained horses and did the agricultural work, commoners were the farmers, artisans created farm equipment and tools for horse riding, and the marabouts and non-Islamic priests dealt in magic and divination (p. 8). In summary the Empires organisation was that the central government was in Kansala, the Kaabu Mansaba was the emperor with Farim Mansa's as governors of each province, provinces provided soldiers and were further divided into administrative units, who were governed over by aristocratic families (p. 5).

The empires was Mandinka, the lingua franca was Mandinka, the social institutions was Mandinka, the political institutions was Mandinka, and the historical traditions was Mandinka, the empire prided itself on its Imperial Mandinka history (p. 11). 'Mandinkization' was big in the empire, individuals from other ethnic background became Mandinka culturally, and the frequent inter-ethnic marriages between the Mandinka and other ethnicities assisted the process, Europeans and Afro-Europeans living in the region could and would become 'Mandinkized' to a certain extent, due to these loose ethnical boundaries it became that kinship was more important than ethnicity (p. 12). Kinship was important at the highest echelons of society. The elite were likely to identify with each other regardless of ethnic backgrounds, Soninke who practiced Soninkeya was their identification, Soninke referred to animists in the region, this term bound together these elites regardless of origins or location (p. 12). Their religion was the worship of stocks and stones and regularly communication with divinatory, the high priest had residence in the main capital of the empire (p. 368). Kaabu was the most powerful Western Mandinka state at the time after Mali fell (p. 13).

Commoners lived through the employment of their skills, such as growing crops, rearing livestock, becoming traders for the nobles, or marabouts making magical charms for elite warriors (p. 15). Those with no way of employing their skills were in a dangerous situation, and servitude was likely to their end under Europeans, North Africans, or far off African courts (p. 15).

Moreover, the Kaabu integrated more closely the trade networks of Guinea Bissau to North Africa in the 14th century, and the Europeans in the 15th century (p. 3). The trade that Kaabu tapped into in Guinea Bissau was economically enrichening (p. 4). Slaves were a large source of income, reports estimated in the years between the 1600s and 1700s, 700 slaves annually left the region, so 70,000 slaves in a 100 years were exported, which Kaabu would have had a big hand in supplying (p. 5) The Arabians (North Africans) and surrounding merchants were noted for trading specifically in the region for gold, which the country was said to have much of (p. 367).

Decline 
After 800 years of existence and 47 Mansa's the Empire began to decline for multiple reasons including civil war. In the 18th and 19th centuries Muslim states surrounded this pagan state, resulting in the Imamate of Futa Jallon declaring Jihad on them, with assistance from Muslim Soninke and Mandinka chiefs. Futa Jallon gained support from the local Fula's who wanted independence from Kaabu (p. 5, 6).  The two states warred for a number of years with Kaabu repelling the Imamate for a long period, stopping the Imamate at the fort of Berekolong until the 1860s, where they were defeated at Berekolong. This war lead to a final confrontation between the Imamate and Kaabu in 1867 called the Battle of Kansala, an army led by General Alfa Molo Balde laid siege to the earthen walls of Kansala for 11 days. The Fulani forces consisted of 35,000 ground troops and 12,000 cavalry. Oral traditions say a Timbo marabout told the Fulani forces that if they fired the first shot they would lose, and a Jakhanke told the Nyancho if they fired the first shot they would lose. The siege was in a stalemate until a Nyancho angered at the presence of Fula troops outside their walls, seeing it cowardly not to attack shot first, the Mandinka kept the Fulani from climbing the walls for a time, but the walls were overwhelmed. The Mansaba Dianke Walli seeing that he would lose, gave the Imamate a pyrrhic victory, ordering his troops to set the cities gunpowder on fire, killing the Mandinka defenders alongside the Imamate ones. The loss of Kansala marked the end of the Kaabu, alongside Mandinka dominance in the region with their incorporation into the Imamate of Futa Jallon (p. 3). Smaller Mandinka states did continue to exist in the region until their incorporation into the Portuguese Empire (p. 7).

Kingdom of Bissau

Origins 
The Kingdom of Bissau was a Kingdom started by the son of the King of Quinara, whom began the kingdom when he moved to Bissau with his pregnant sister, six wives, and subjects from his father's kingdom. The seven clans of the kingdom are said to of came from the sister and six wives of Mecau, these being the Bottat, Bossuzu, Boiga, Bosafinte, Bodjukumo, Bosso, and Bossassun the latter of which descends from the sister of Mecau. Characteristic of the region the Bossassun inherited the throne, and were the nobility alongside the Bodjukumo. The Kingdom of Bissau had multiple vassal states such as Prabis, Antula, Safim, Quisset, Tor, and Biombo.

Society 
The Kingdom of Bissau was highly stratified with the top of society being the king, nobles, and then commoners and was strictly enforced (p. 73-79). The King of Bissau would go through their coronation, receive their badge of office for this kingdom was a spear, other Papel Kingdoms used the bow (p. 66). The coronation involved the practice of binding and beating the king, as the king should know what punishment felt like before administering it (p. 66). Nobles would be assigned to principalities as governors subject to the King of Bissau and part of his court (p. 364). Houses in the kingdom were made of clay, and roofs of leaves from the surrounding trees, and the inhabitants were pagans until the Jesuits arrival (p. 366).

Papels suffered slave raids from the Bijagos who would stage maritime expeditions into Bissau for slaves (p. 204). However, Papels themselves were slave traders, staging slave raids against the Balantas, Biafadas, and Bijagos with the assistance from the Europeans and Lançados (p. 207).

Decline 
Centuries of warfare between the Kingdom of Bissau and Portuguese Empire of which the kingdom strongly defended its sovereignty, defeating the Portuguese in the years of 1891, 1894, and 1904 during the Pacification Campaigns (p. 9). However, in 1915 and after 30 years of the Portuguese campaigns, the Portuguese defeated the Kingdom of Bissau under the command of Officer Teixeira Pinto, and Warlord Abdul Injai, and for the first time in the kingdoms existence lost its independence.

Beafada Kingdoms

Kingdom of Guinala 
The King of Guinala was a grandiose figure, attended too by a retinue of archers, alongside 50 guard dogs dressed in tough Sea-Cow skin  (p. 365). These dogs were formed in response to slave raiders breaking into homes, and kidnapping them (p. 365).

Under the king there were seven governors who wore hats given to them as a sign of their station (p. 365). The kingdom extended jurisdiction over six kingdoms, the governors of these kingdoms were gathered in the form of a council.  Under the king would be the main governor who was described as a President (p. 365).

Their religion was idol worship. The idols in the region were called 'Xina', though some converted to Roman Catholicism in the early period of European contact (p. 366).

Royal funerals went as such, twelve men in long coats made of feathers, following a band of pipers playing mournful music, declared the king's death to the masses on the streets (p. 366). White clothes would be worn them for the day, nothing being done except walking the streets in mourning. The late king's friends, relatives, and servants would  congregate to appoint a successor (p. 366). The king's body would be washed, his entrails burnt before an idol, the ashes of his entrails preserved and put with the body of which would lie in state for a month, then all the subjects of the kingdoms would bring balsam, myrrh, ambergris, musk, and other perfumes to burn and be smoked around the corps (p. 366). Six eminent people would carry the body to be buried while clothed in white silk, behind a band of musicians followed with mournful music, who in turn are followed by many people singing mournfully or crying aloud, the prince followed on horseback while dressed in white (p. 366). Near the grave waited his women, servants, horses, and favourite people to be put to death and buried alongside him, to serve in the afterlife, their death would be by their toes and fingers being severed, and bones crushed by stamping. Servants would try leave the services of the king prior to his death, or hide when they realised he would not recover (p. 366).

Kingdom of Biguba 
The people of the kingdom lived the same way as those from the Kingdom of Guinala. Observers to this kingdom said once a king died, the crown fell went to the strongest family, this would and did lead to armed conflict, battles lasted until the strongest contestant reduced his opponent to obedience (p. 367).

They followed the same religion as those from the Kingdom of Guinala (p. 367).

The Kingdom of Biguba had less chiefs underneath them than the Kingdom of Guinala, holding administration over four kingdoms with four governors (p. 65).

A sizeable population of Afro-Portuguese citizens lived in the kingdom, these Afro-Portuguese swore allegiance to the natives, and they would follow local religions, dress like the locals, and undergo scarification (p. 366).

Island States of the Bijagos

Origins 
The Bijagos are from the region the Biafada are currently in, leaving their original home for the Islands, the population that migrated were not homogenous with Islands having differing affinities to different mainland ethnicities (p. 25). Each Island was governed by lords whom swore allegiance to the King of Isla do Po (p. 364). All the Islands were inhabited except for the Island of Bolama which was inhabited by the Biafadas, however, control of the Island has traded hands multiple times (p. 7) (p. 5).

Society 
Described as large in stature, and reputed for their courage and hardy disposition, they were renown for their skills in boat craft, sailing, harassing the waters of the region, and regular staging of raids on the mainland. The Bijagos would attack European ships that crossed their waters, and those who tried to take their land (p. 364).  The Bijago canoes were unique in that they were sea worthy, meaning after their coastal raids regions they did not have to fear retaliation.

Bijago society was warlike. Women cultivated land, constructed houses, and gathered food (p. 204). Men were dedicated to boat crafting and warring the mainland, attacking the coastal people like the Jolas, Papels, and Balantas, and believing on the sea they had no king, also attacking other Islands (p. 204). These soldiers were reputed to be excellent swimmers, sailors, and soldiers, in this society women chose their husbands, only choosing warriors with the biggest reputation. Successful warriors could have many wives and boats, the owner of these boats were entitled to 1/3 of the spoils of any expedition (p. 205).

Coastal raids went as such, warriors anointing their body in red ochre, coal and white clay, placed feathers in their hair, and hung horse tails from their breasts with little bells. A priestess would break an egg over the stern of the boat, setting off to arrive on the coast at night (p. 205). With rapid speed they would arrive on the coast, surroun coastal villages, set fire to the homes, and if met with resisted would be cut down though occupants usually surrendered (p. 205). So efficient were these raids that Portuguese traders tried to get the Portuguese authorities to stop them, as they were decimating the Biafadas, however, so successful were these raids, the Portuguese were getting a high surplus of slaves, and Lemos Coelho a Cape Verdean trader described how in 25 trips over a couple of years over a 1,000 slaves were captured by the raids (p. 206). In the early 17th century with the monetary gains made from the raids, the Bijago Islands joined together in their war with the mainland, increasing the size of their fleets and soldiers (p. 206). These raids resulted in the King of Guinala losing six kingdoms, and the king fleeing into the forest (p. 364). The Portuguese influence on the Bijago was by appealing to their honour, if slaves were few in number in the ports they would call it a stain on their good name, and other Europeans would ignore their ports as a result. These appeals to their pride would be enough to increase their raiding intensity (p. 207).

The Bijagos were the most safe from enslavement, their lsland kept them out of the hands of the mainland slave raiders (p. 218). Europeans did not find them fit for slavery and avoided having them as slaves. Portuguese sources say the children made good slaves but not the adults, whom were likely to commit suicide as they believed their spirits returned back to the Bijagos, known for slave rebellions on ships, and in the New World for their tendency to escape (p. 218, 219).

European Contact

Struggle for independence

Amílcar Cabral was assassinated in Conakry in 1973, and party leadership fell to Aristides Pereira, who later became the first president of the Republic of Cape Verde. The PAIGC National Assembly met at Boe in the southeastern region and declared the independence of Guinea-Bissau on 24 September 1973 and was recognized by a 93–7 UN General Assembly vote in November.

Independence from Portugal
Following Portugal's April 1974 Carnation Revolution, it granted independence to Guinea-Bissau on 10 September 1974. Luís Cabral, Amílcar Cabral's half-brother, became President. In late 1980, the government was overthrown in a coup led by Prime Minister and former armed forces commander João Bernardo Vieira.

The United States recognised Guinea Bissau's independence on 10 September 1974.

Democracy
In 1994, 20 years after independence from Portugal, the country's first multiparty legislative and presidential elections were held. An army uprising that triggered the Guinea-Bissau Civil War in 1998, created hundreds of thousands of displaced persons. The president was ousted by a military junta on 7 May 1999. An interim government turned over power in February 2000 when opposition leader Kumba Ialá took office following two rounds of transparent presidential elections. Guinea-Bissau's transition back to democracy has been complicated by a crippled economy devastated by civil war and the military's predilection for governmental meddling. 

Despite reports that there had been an influx of arms in the weeks leading up to the election and reports of some 'disturbances during campaigning' – including attacks on the presidential palace and the Interior Ministry by as-yet-unidentified gunmen – European monitors labelled the election as "calm and organized".

In January 2000, the second round of a general election took place. The presidential election resulted in a victory for opposition leader Kumba Ialá of the Party for Social Renewal (PRS), who defeated Malam Bacai Sanhá of the ruling PAIGC. The PRS were also victorious in the National People's Assembly election, winning 38 of the 102 seats.

In September 2003, a military coup was conducted. The military arrested Ialá on the charge of being "unable to solve the problems". After being delayed several times, legislative elections were held in March 2004. A mutiny of military factions in October 2004 resulted in the death of the head of the armed forces and caused widespread unrest.

In June 2005, presidential elections were held for the first time since the coup that deposed Ialá. Ialá returned as the candidate for the PRS, claiming to be the legitimate president of the country, but the election was won by former president João Bernardo Vieira, deposed in the 1999 coup. Vieira beat Malam Bacai Sanhá in a run-off election. Sanhá initially refused to concede, claiming that tampering and electoral fraud occurred in two constituencies including the capital, Bissau.

Despite reports of arms entering the country prior to the election and some "disturbances during campaigning", including attacks on government offices by unidentified gunmen, foreign election monitors described the 2005 election overall as "calm and organized".

Three years later, PAIGC won a strong parliamentary majority, with 67 of 100 seats, in the parliamentary election held in November 2008. In November 2008, President Vieira's official residence was attacked by members of the armed forces, killing a guard but leaving the president unharmed.

On 2 March 2009, however, Vieira was assassinated by what preliminary reports indicated to be a group of soldiers avenging the death of the head of joint chiefs of staff, General Batista Tagme Na Wai, who had been killed in an explosion the day before. Vieira's death did not trigger widespread violence, but there were signs of turmoil in the country, according to the advocacy group Swisspeace. Military leaders in the country pledged to respect the constitutional order of succession. National Assembly Speaker Raimundo Pereira was appointed as an interim president until a nationwide election on 28 June 2009. It was won by Malam Bacai Sanhá of the PAIGC, against Kumba Ialá as the presidential candidate of the PRS.

On 9 January 2012, President Sanhá died of complications from diabetes, and Pereira was again appointed as an interim president. On the evening of 12 April 2012, members of the country's military staged a coup d'état and arrested the interim president and a leading presidential candidate. Former vice chief of staff, General Mamadu Ture Kuruma, assumed control of the country in the transitional period and started negotiations with opposition parties.

José Mário Vaz was the President of Guinea-Bissau from 2014 until 2019 presidential elections. At the end of his term, Vaz became the first elected president to complete his five-year mandate. He lost the 2019 election, however, to Umaro Sissoco Embaló, who took office in February 2020. Embaló is the first president to be elected without the backing of the PAIGC.

In February 2022, there was a failed coup attempt against President Umaro Sissoco Embaló. According to Embaló the coup attempt was linked to drug trafficking.

See also
Politics of Guinea-Bissau
United Nations Peacebuilding Support Office in Guinea-Bissau (UNOGBIS)
 City of Bissau history and timeline

References

External links
Background Note: Guinea-Bissau